North Charleston High School (NCHS) is a public high school in North Charleston, South Carolina, United States. It is a part of the Charleston County School District (CCSD).

The school previously used the 5,000-seat Attaway-Heinsohn Stadium, named after Alvin F. Heinsohn and Hubert H. Attaway, built in the 1950s for $160,000, and dedicated in 1956. It was located across Montague Avenue from the North Charleston High building. The district announced in 2018 that the stadium will be demolished and replaced with the North Charleston Center for Advanced Studies. North Charleston High games will be played at another stadium with those of other high schools.

Pattison's Academy, a charter school for students aged 5–21 with disabilities, moved into a wing of the NCHS campus in 2018.  it had 35 students.

References

External links
 

Public high schools in South Carolina
Schools in Charleston County, South Carolina